Steinar Aadnekvam (born 4 April 1984) is a Norwegian jazz guitarist.

Life and career 
Aadnekvam was born in Bergen, and grew up in different towns and cities in Norway, Denmark, Italy, Luxembourg and Sweden. He got his first guitar at the age of 4, and by 9 years old he was composing music and listening to artists such as Elvis Presley, Prince and Michael Jackson. As a teenager his interest turned to Jazz when discovering artists like Charlie Parker, John McLaughlin, Miles Davis, Rahsaan Roland Kirk, Abdullah Ibrahim. Later influences include Egberto Gismonti, Hermeto Pascoal and Indian classical music among others.

Aadnekvam studied at Södra Latins gymnasium, and later Royal College of Music, Stockholm, Sweden, notably studying under Mikke Rönnkvist, Thomas Wixtröm, Andreas Oberg, Alvaro Is Rojas and Sten Hostfalt. Aadnekvam turned his curiosity outwards as he decided to travel to Mumbai, India for studies with classical Indian master flutist Hariprasad Chaurasia at his intern school Vrindaban Gurukul.

In 2009, Aadnekvam was nominated for the 'Young Nordic Guitarist Award' by the Uppsala International Guitar Festival, and in 2010 finalist at the 'Norsk JazzIntro' at Moldejazz. He started his own record label 'MMYH Records' (Music Makes You Happy) with his debut album Simple Things (2010). In the following years he played feature concerts at clubs and major jazz festivals in Norway, Sweden, Finland, Denmark, Latvia, Poland and Romania. Later turning to work on his two Brazilian album collaborations Abacaxeiro and 'Ecology'. He also involved himself in concert touring, masterclasses, tv appearances, and radio broadcasts related to these in the Nordics and in Brazil.

In 2015, Aadnekvam signed for the Norwegian label Losen Records for his fourth studio album Freedoms Tree (2015), featuring an international ensemble including various guest performers and recorded at the classic Atlantis Studio in Stockholm, Sweden. The album was then performed in concert at the 2016 Stavanger International Jazz Festival, MaiJazz  featuring a 7 piece ensemble.

Aadnekvam's continued collaboration with Losen Records continued with the release of the album Freedoms Trio (2016), which in turn became the name of his working band and world jazz collaboration, featuring bassist Rubem Farias from São Paulo, Brazil and drummer, singer Deodato Siquir from Maputo, Mozambique. Their sophomore album "Freedoms Trio II" (Losen Records) was released in 2018. Between 2016 and 2019, 'Freedoms Trio' performed over 120 concerts across Europe at jazz clubs and festivals in Norway, Sweden, Finland, Denmark, Latvia, Germany, Belgium, Switzerland, Italy, Kosovo, Azerbaijan. They were also selected to perform at the Jazzahead Festival Overseas Night in Bremen, Germany in 2018, and at the NAMM Show 2019 Official Artist Selection in Anaheim, California, USA.
 
From May to June 2019, Steinar Aadnekvam traveled to Maputo, Mozambique for a series of concerts and workshops in collaboration with Deodato Siquir and local artists.

Discography 
 2010: Simple Things (MMYH Records)
 2011: Abacaxeiro (MMYH Records)
 2014: Ecology (MMYH Records)
 2015: Freedoms Tree (Losen Records)
 2016: Freedoms Trio (Losen Records)
 2018: Freedoms Trio II (Losen Records)

References

External links 

21st-century Norwegian guitarists
Norwegian jazz guitarists
Norwegian male guitarists
Norwegian composers
Norwegian male composers
1984 births
Musicians from Bergen
Living people
21st-century Norwegian male musicians
Male jazz musicians